Upper Wheatvale is a rural locality in the Southern Downs Region, Queensland, Australia.

References 

Southern Downs Region
Localities in Queensland